Joseph Myerscough (8 August 1893 – 29 July 1975) was an English footballer. His regular position was as a forward. He was born in Galgate, Lancashire. He played for Lancaster Town, Bradford Park Avenue, and Manchester United.

External links
MUFCInfo.com profile

1893 births
1975 deaths
English footballers
Bradford (Park Avenue) A.F.C. players
Manchester United F.C. players
Lancaster City F.C. players
Association football forwards